Juan Andrés Toloza Cortés (born 4 May 1985) is a Chilean footballer who last played for Chilean Segunda División side Deportes Colina as a midfielder.

Club career
In 2005, he had a step with Club Social y Deportivo Cristiano Hosanna in the Tercera División. 

In 2010, he took part in the Copa Sudamericana with his team Unión San Felipe, scoring a goal in the 4–2 victory against LDU Quito, in the Round of 16 of the competition.

Honours
Unión San Felipe
Copa Chile: 2009

Deportes Vallenar
Segunda División: 2017 Transición

References

External links
Profile on FC Braşov website

1985 births
Living people
People from Chañaral Province
Chilean footballers
Chilean expatriate footballers
Cobresal footballers
Deportes Copiapó footballers
Coquimbo Unido footballers
Unión San Felipe footballers
FC Brașov (1936) players
Colo-Colo footballers
Colo-Colo B footballers
San Marcos de Arica footballers
Curicó Unido footballers
Deportes Vallenar footballers
Deportes Colina footballers
Primera B de Chile players
Tercera División de Chile players
Chilean Primera División players
Liga I players
Segunda División Profesional de Chile players
Association football midfielders
Chilean expatriate sportspeople in Romania
Expatriate footballers in Romania
Chilean people of Basque descent